In mathematics, −1 (negative one or minus one) is the additive inverse of 1, that is, the number that when added to 1 gives the additive identity element, 0. It is the negative integer greater than negative two (−2) and less than 0.

Algebraic properties 
Multiplying a number by −1 is equivalent to changing the sign of the number – that is, for any  we have . This can be proved using the distributive law and the axiom that 1 is the multiplicative identity:

.

Here we have used the fact that any number  times 0 equals 0, which follows by cancellation from the equation

.

In other words,

,

, as was to be shown.

Square of −1 
The square of −1, i.e. −1 multiplied by −1, equals 1. As a consequence, a product of two negative numbers is positive.

For an algebraic proof of this result, start with the equation

.

The first equality follows from the above result, and the second follows from the definition of −1 as additive inverse of 1: it is precisely that number which when added to 1 gives 0. Now, using the distributive law, it can be seen that

.

The third equality follows from the fact that 1 is a multiplicative identity. But now adding 1 to both sides of this last equation implies

.

The above arguments hold in any ring, a concept of abstract algebra generalizing integers and real numbers.

Square roots of −1 
Although there are no real square roots of −1, the complex number  satisfies , and as such can be considered as a square root of −1. The only other complex number whose square is −1 is − because there are exactly two square roots of any non‐zero complex number, which follows from the fundamental theorem of algebra. In the algebra of quaternions – where the fundamental theorem does not apply – which contains the complex numbers, the equation  has infinitely many solutions.

Exponentiation to negative integers 
Exponentiation of a non‐zero real number can be extended to negative integers. We make the definition that , meaning that we define raising a number to the power −1 to have the same effect as taking its reciprocal.

A −1 that appears as a superscript of a function does not mean taking the (pointwise) reciprocal of that function, but rather the inverse function of the function. For example,  is a notation for the arcsine function, and in general  denotes the inverse function of ,. When a subset of the codomain is specified inside the function, it instead denotes the preimage of that subset under the function.

Uses
 In software development, −1 is a common initial value for integers and is also used to show that a variable contains no useful information.
 −1 bears relation to Euler's identity since .

See also 

 Balanced ternary
 Menelaus's theorem

References 

−1
Negative one